By-elections for the Tenth Legislative Yuan were held in 2023, one each on 8 January and 4 March, in Taiwan to elect 2 of the 113 members of the Legislative Yuan for the remaining term until 2024. The Democratic Progressive Party flipped a seat from the Kuomintang in Nantou II, and the KMT retained its seat in Taipei III. After the DPP's victory in Nantou II, Frida Tsai would become the first DPP legislator to serve a district in Nantou County since the 2005 constitutional amendment halving the number of legislative seats from 225 to 113.

Background

A by-election was scheduled in Taipei for 8 January 2023, as Legislative Yuan member Chiang Wan-an had resigned his seat before taking office as Mayor of Taipei. Nantou County legislator Hsu Shu-hua vacated her seat upon taking office as Nantou County magistrate on 25 December 2022, and a by-election for her seat was planned for 4 March 2023.

Candidates by main parties

Taipei 3
 called in Taipei City Councillor  to contest the seat. Wang previously expressed no interest in running, citing her recent re-election as councillor, but changed course after being approached by party heavyweights.
 called in Enoch Wu, the founder of Forward Alliance, to contest the seat. He previously ran in the district against Chiang Wan-an in 2020, losing by only 6 percentage points in a traditionally KMT district.

Nantou 2
 called in former magistrate Lin Ming-chen to contest the seat. Nantou County Councillors Yu Hao and Sung Huai-lin, as well as Lin's son, Lin Ju-pin, all expressed interest in running for the legislative seat, but the party nominated Lin Ming-chen after internal polls showed that he performed best against the DPP's Frida Tsai.
 called in former legislator Frida Tsai to contest the seat. Tsai previously ran in the 2022 Nantou magisterial election, as well as the 2020 legislative election for Nantou I, but lost both races.

Results

Taipei 3
Voted on 8 January 2023.

Nantou 2
Voted on 4 March 2023.

Notes

References

2023 elections in Taiwan
By-elections in Taiwan